José Agüero is a Cuban former tennis player.

Agüero had an intermittent Davis Cup career, featuring in a total of eight ties between 1935 and 1952. In 1946 he was runner-up to Mexico's Anselmo Puente in the singles event at the Central American and Caribbean Games in Barranquilla, but won a gold medal in the doubles, partnering Ricardo Morales.

See also
List of Cuba Davis Cup team representatives

References

External links
 
 

Year of birth missing (living people)
Possibly living people
Cuban male tennis players
Central American and Caribbean Games medalists in tennis
Central American and Caribbean Games gold medalists for Cuba
Central American and Caribbean Games silver medalists for Cuba
Competitors at the 1938 Central American and Caribbean Games
Competitors at the 1946 Central American and Caribbean Games
20th-century Cuban people